The 1917–18 season was Port Vale's second season of football after going into abeyance during World War I. Improving on the previous season, they managed to finish in 11th-place. The team managed a run of just one defeat in 11 games, though ended the league campaign with a run of six defeats in eight games.

Overview
Port Vale had a difficult start to the season, losing key players to conscription and facing champions Liverpool home and away. They actually led 2–0 at half-time in the season opener, though ended the match with a 3–2 defeat and then were beaten 4–0 at Anfield. They picked up a draw and win over Southport Central, but were beaten home and away by Potteries derby rivals Stoke; the home tie with Stoke saw a season-high crowd of 10,000. A 5–2 win over Burnley, in which David Bowcock scored a hat-trick, was the first of a five match unbeaten run, though they did draw the other four matches. A 4–0 home defeat in which they were "outclassed" by Stockport County ruined this run, before they put together another five match unbeaten run.

A 4–0 win over Blackpool on 26 January took Vale up to seventh-place. However they then suffered poor form until the end of the campaign, picking up just three points from their remaining eight matches. This poor run of defeats included a heavy 7–0 loss at Everton, though they were comforted by their £60 share of the 15,000 crowd. They picked up an expected two points away with a 5–1 win at rock-bottom Blackburn Rovers, but lost the final game of the season 2–0 at home to Rovers, which was only the away side's second victory of the season. Around this time club nicknames were becoming popular, and The Staffordshire Sentinel reporter "The Wanderer" suggested "the Colliers", in reference to local coal mines, though the nickname failed to catch on. They ended the season in a respectable 11th-place; David Bowcock's seven goals were enough to make him top-scorer as few attackers could manage to play in half the club's matches. The six game Subsidiary Tournament was used as an exercise to blood young players, and they lost five of their games in a difficult group of Manchester City, Manchester United and Stoke. Despite low costs the club announced a loss of £33 and the total debt reached £4,000, leaving directors grumbling about their financial responsibilities.

Results
Port Vale's score comes first

Legend

Football League Lancashire Section

League table

Matches

Lancashire Section Subsidiary Tournament

League table

Matches

Player statistics

Appearances

Top scorers

Transfers

Transfers in

Transfers out

References
Specific

General

Port Vale F.C. seasons
Port Vale